is a Japanese table tennis player.

Achievements

ITTF Tours
Women's singles

Women's doubles

References

2000 births
Japanese female table tennis players
Living people
Sportspeople from Ehime Prefecture
People from Matsuyama, Ehime